Gabriela García, a Venezuelan professional footballer
 Gabi Garcia, a Brazilian mixed martial artist